Surduk (Serbian Cyrillic: Сурдук) is a village in Serbia. It is situated in the Stara Pazova municipality, in the Srem District, Vojvodina province. The village has a Serb ethnic majority and its population numbering 1,589 people (2002 census).

Name

Surduk derives its name from the Turkish word for the cliffs near the Danube river. In ancient times it was known as Rittium. In Croatian it is known as Surduk, and in Hungarian as Szurdok.

Ethnic groups (2002 census)

Serbs = 1,463 (92.07%)
Roma = 61
Slovaks = 10
Greek = 1
others (including Hungarians, Croats, etc.).

Historical population

1961: 1,782
1971: 1,467
1981: 1,332
1991: 1,253

See also
List of places in Serbia
List of cities, towns and villages in Vojvodina

References
Slobodan Ćurčić, Broj stanovnika Vojvodine, Novi Sad, 1996.

External links

Surduk website

Populated places in Syrmia